The Middlesex Women's cricket team is the women's representative cricket team for the English historic county of Middlesex. They play their home games at various grounds, most commonly at Mill Hill School, and are captained by Naomi Dattani. They won Division 2 of the Women's County Championship in 2019 and won the Women's Twenty20 Cup in 2018. They are partnered with the regional side Sunrisers.

History

1935–1996: Early History
Middlesex Women played their first recorded match in 1935, against Civil Service Women, and went on to play various one-off games over the following years, most often against surrounding teams such as Surrey Women. They joined the Women's Area Championship in 1980, winning the first two titles, and winning again in 1985.

1997– : Women's County Championship
After the Area Championship ended in 1996, Middlesex Women were one of the founding teams for the Women's County Championship, beginning in 1997, finishing 5th in Division Two in their first season. After being relegated to Division Three the following season, Middlesex then began a steady rise up through the divisions, finally reaching Division One for the first time in 2011. From here, they remained a mid-table side over subsequent seasons, until they were relegated in 2018, the same year in which they won their first major title, the Twenty20 Cup (after being runners-up in 2014 and 2017). In 2019, the final year of the County Championship, Middlesex won Division 2. Since 2015, Middlesex have also competed in the London Cup, in which they play a Twenty20 match against Surrey. Middlesex won the first five competitions, but Surrey won in 2020. The side has also competed in the Women's London Championship since 2020. In 2021, they competed in the South East Group of the Twenty20 Cup, finishing 5th with 3 wins, and regained the London Cup, beating Surrey by 8 wickets. They won their group of the Twenty20 Cup in 2022, going unbeaten.

Players

Current squad
Based on appearances in the 2022 season.  denotes players with international caps.

Notable players
Players who have played for Middlesex and played internationally are listed below, in order of first international appearance (given in brackets):

 Doris Turner (1934)
 Joan Davis (1937)
 Eileen Whelan (1937)
 Audrey Collins (1937)
 Mary Duggan (1949)
 Megan Lowe (1949)
 Netta Rheinberg (1949)
 Winifred Leech (1951)
 Mary Spry (1951)
 Betty Birch (1951)
 Anne Sanders (1954)
 Helen Sharpe (1957)
 Esme Irwin (1960)
 Liz Amos (1961)
 Margaret Jude (1963)
 Bev Brentnall (1966)
 Jacqueline Court (1973)
 Ros Heggs (1973)
 Glynis Hullah (1976)
 Catherine Mowat (1978)
 Avril Starling (1982)
 Helen Stother (1982)
 Gillian Smith (1986)
 Lisa Nye (1988)
 Debra Stock (1992)
 Sandra Dawson (1993)
 Chanderkanta Kaul (1993)
 Shaiza Khan (1997)
 Sharmeen Khan (1997)
 Beth Morgan (1999)
 Laura Joyce (2001)
 Kate Blackwell (2005)
 Isabelle Westbury (2005)
 Jodie Fields (2006)
 Lauren Ebsary (2008)
 Julie Hunter (2010)
 Fran Wilson (2010)
 Holly Huddleston (2014)
 Catherine Dalton (2015)
 Alex Hartley (2016)
 Sophia Dunkley (2018)
 Maia Bouchier (2021)
 Natasha Miles (2021)
 Lauren Bell (2022)
 Saskia Horley (2022)

Seasons

Women's County Championship

Women's Twenty20 Cup

Honours

 Women's Area Championship:
 Champions (3) – 1980, 1981 & 1985
 County Championship:
 Division Two Champions (2) – 2010 & 2019
 Division Three Champions (1) – 2001
 Twenty20 Cup:
 Division One Champions (1) – 2018
 Group winners (1) – 2022

See also
Middlesex County Cricket Club
Sunrisers (women's cricket)

References

Women's cricket teams in England
Cricket teams in London
Cricket in Middlesex
Middlesex County Cricket Club